Leutra is a small river in Thuringia, Germany. It flows into the Saale in the centre of Jena. Another small river also named Leutra flows into the Saale in the village Maua (part of Jena), 6 km to the south.

See also
List of rivers of Thuringia

Rivers of Thuringia
Rivers of Germany